Live is a live album by the American Alternative rock band Tabitha's Secret. The album was released in 1999.

Track listing
"Million Miles" - 5:37
"Paint Me Blue" - 4:49
"Just Plain Tired" - 4:23
"This Is Not A Love Song" - 4:06
"Unkind" - 3:30
"High" - 4:38
"Jesus Was An Alien" - 4:43
"Here Comes Horses" - 4:39
"Loss, Strain & Butterflies" - 3:17
"3 A.M." - 3:55
"Forever December" - 6:34
"Dear Joan" - 5:27

1999 live albums
Tabitha's Secret albums